Latin Quarter (German title: Quartier Latin) is a 1929 German silent drama film directed by Augusto Genina and starring Gina Manès, Carmen Boni and Helga Thomas. It was based on a novel by Maurice Dekobra. It was shot at the Staaken Studios and on location in Paris. The film's art direction was by Franz Schroedter. It premiered at the Ufa-Palast am Zoo in Berlin.

Cast
 Gina Manès as Prinzessin Bolinsky (Salome)  
 Carmen Boni as Louisette Mercier (Mimi)  
 Helga Thomas as Laura  
 Iván Petrovich as Ralph O'Connor Rodolpho 
 Gaston Jacquet as Baron Harvey  
 Maurice Braddell as Mario  
 Augusto Bandini as Jaques  
 Nino Ottavi as Jean  
 Magnus Stifter as Diener

References

Bibliography 
 Goble, Alan. The Complete Index to Literary Sources in Film. Walter de Gruyter, 1999.

External links 
 

1929 films
Films of the Weimar Republic
German silent feature films
German black-and-white films
Films directed by Augusto Genina
Films set in Paris
Films based on French novels
Films shot in Paris
Films shot at Staaken Studios
1929 drama films
German drama films